R Geminorum (R Gem) is a Mira variable and technetium star in the constellation Gemini.

R Geminorum pulsates with an average period of 369.9 days, varying by up to eight magnitudes at visual wavelengths. When at maximum light its apparent visual magnitude is usually between 6 and 7, while at minimum light it is typically near magnitude 14.

R Geminorum is one of the brightest known examples of an S-type star, a type that is similar to M-type star, but whose spectra shows zirconium oxide, yttrium oxide and technetium. These exotic elements are formed in the star's core. Technetium has a half-life of just 4.2 million years, so it must have been brought up from the core relatively recently. R Gem has an unusual amount of it, even for an S-type star.

References 

Gemini (constellation)
S-type stars
Mira variables
Geminorum, R
Durchmusterung objects
053791
2671
034356